The Blue Mouse is a 1928 German silent comedy film directed by Johannes Guter and starring Jenny Jugo, Harry Halm, and Brita Appelgren.

The film's sets were designed by the art director Jacek Rotmil.

Cast

References

Bibliography

External links

1928 films
Films of the Weimar Republic
Films directed by Johannes Guter
German silent feature films
UFA GmbH films
German black-and-white films
1928 comedy films
German comedy films
Silent comedy films
1920s German films
1920s German-language films